Lindsi Louise Cutshall (born October 18, 1990) is an American former soccer defender for Sky Blue FC in the National Women's Soccer League (NWSL).

Early life
Born to Mark and Terri Lisonbee, Lindsi was raised with her two siblings in Park City, Utah, where she attended and played for Park City High School. She was named to the 1st Team All-State in 2005, 2006, and 2008, was a Parade All-American in 2008, NSCAA Youth All-American 2006 and 2007, and a High School State Champion in 2005. She played for the Black Diamond Soccer club Team and helped them achieve a top 25 national ranking, Score at the Shore Champions (2006), US Club Region G Champions (2006), US Club National Cup Semi-Finalists (2006), and San Diego Surf Thanksgiving Cup Champions (2008).

Brigham Young University
Cutshall attended BYU where she majored in Recreation Management and Youth Leadership with an emphasis in Leisure Services Management. Coming into her freshman year, Cutshall was a Top Drawer Soccer top 15 recruit. While at BYU, she totaled 32 points off 13 goals and anchored the BYU defense. In 2012, Cutshall was named the West Coast Conference Player of the Year, was a MAC Hermann Trophy finalist and was selected to the NSCAA All-America First Team. She was a part of the 2012 BYU women's soccer team that allowed a mere 13 goals all season long and advanced all the way to the Elite 8 and a #2 National ranking.

Playing career

Club

Sky Blue FC
Cutshall was the fourth overall pick in the inaugural National Women's Soccer League draft, going to Sky Blue FC.

She sat out the 2016 season.

International
Cutshall was named to the 20-player United States U-23 roster that represented the United States in the Four Nations Tournament in La Manga, Spain from February 22 – March 5, 2013.

Personal life
Cutshall is a member of the Church of Jesus Christ of Latter-day Saints (LDS Church). She married Rich Cutshall in the summer of 2012.

References

External links

 Lindsi Cutshall profile at National Women's Soccer League
 Lindsi Cutshall profile at Sky Blue FC
 US Soccer player profile
 Brigham Young University player profile

Living people
1990 births
NJ/NY Gotham FC players
National Women's Soccer League players
American women's soccer players
Parade High School All-Americans (girls' soccer)
BYU Cougars women's soccer players
Women's association football defenders
NJ/NY Gotham FC draft picks